Poranthera microphylla, sometimes referred to as the small poranthera, is a widespread Australian annual herb that grows naturally in a variety of habitats. A tiny soft plant, up to 10 cm in height with weak branches. Occasionally noticed after wet winters when it comes into flower. The specific epithet microphylla refers to the very small leaves.

References

Flora of Australia
Phyllanthaceae
Taxa named by Adolphe-Théodore Brongniart